Bill Schneider (born June 17, 1971) is an American musician. He has played bass in the punk rock band Pinhead Gunpowder since 1990, as well as providing vocals and writing the lyrics to the song Backyard Flames. He has been in other bands such as The Influents, Monsula, Uranium 9 Volt, Sawhorse, The Skinflutes, and The Coverups. He worked as guitar and bass technician for Green Day's Billie Joe Armstrong and Mike Dirnt on their albums Nimrod and Warning and currently works as tour crew manager for Green Day.

References 

Living people
American punk rock bass guitarists
American male bass guitarists
1971 births